Frankie Dusen (1878–1936) was an early New Orleans jazz trombonist. He played with Buddy Bolden's band, and following Bolden's health problems took over as bandleader of the group and renamed it The Eagle Band, considered one of the best in New Orleans for more than a decade.

He was born in Algiers section of New Orleans. During the Great Depression he played with the era orchestra on the ship "S.S Capitol," and later played alongside Louis Dumaine. Dusen also taught music. He died in 1936 at the age of 58.

References

1878 births
1936 deaths
American jazz trombonists
Male trombonists
Musicians from New Orleans
The Eagle Band members